Siberian Krai (Sibirsky Kray) was a krai of the Russian SFSR. It existed from 1925 to 1930. The krai's administrative center was the city of Novosibirsk.

History
Siberian Krai was founded on May 25, 1925.

July 30, 1930 krai was divided into West Siberian and East Siberian krais.

See also

External links
 V. Boldyrev, M. Skursky, Siberian Krai in numbers. Novonikolayevsk: Sibkraiizdat, 1925.
 Siberian Krai. Novosibirsk, 1930.

1925 establishments in Russia
1930 disestablishments in Russia